Kerala Blasters Football Club, commonly referred to as The Blasters, is an Indian professional football club based in Kochi, Kerala, that competes in the Indian Super League, the top tier of football in India. The club was established in May 2014 during the inaugural season of the Indian Super League.

The club played their inaugural match on 13 October 2014, losing 1–0 to NorthEast United. The Blasters are the three time runners up of the Indian Super League. They first entered the final in 2014, where they lost 1–0 to ATK after an injury time goal from them. In 2016, they were again defeated 4–3 by ATK, this time through penalties in the final. The club entered the final for the third time in 2022, where they were defeated 3–1 by Hyderabad FC through penalties. The Blasters plays home games at the Jawaharlal Nehru Stadium in Kochi. In most of the seasons since the club's founding, Kerala Blasters have held the record for the highest league attendance, regularly attracting spectators of over 30,000 per game. The Blasters shares rivalry with fellow South Indian neighbours Bengaluru FC and Chennaiyin FC, with whom they contest in the South Indian Derby.

The Blasters are one of the most widely supported clubs in Asia and has one of the largest social media following among the football clubs from the continent. The club is also known for their fan base, including the supporters' group called Manjappada, which has gained a reputational for being one of the most vocal and passionate fan clubs in Asia. The club's crest features an elephant holding a football with its trunk, denoting Kerala's deep connection with the sport. The club's traditional kit consist of yellow and blue colours scheme, with yellow being the primary colour and identity of the club ever since the beginning.

History

Formation
 
In early 2014, the All India Football Federation—the governing body of association football in India, announced they would accept bids for the ownership of eight franchises from selected cities for the inaugural season of Indian Super League (ISL). On 13 April 2014, it was announced the rights to the Kochi franchise had been won by former India national cricket team captain Sachin Tendulkar and entrepreneur Prasad V. Potluri. On 27 May 2014, the club's official name, Kerala Blasters FC, was announced.

Indian international Mehtab Hossain was the first player signed by the club, as he was the first one to be picked up by the Blasters during the first domestic draft. The management also selected seven other Indian players for their inaugural season. On 13 August 2014, former England international goalkeeper David James was chosen as the first head coach and marquee player of the team. On 21 August 2014, the club participated in the international draft; the management selected seven foreign players for the team. Michael Chopra, Iain Hume, Pulga, Erwin Spitzner, Pedro Gusmão, Cedric Hengbart and Raphaël Romey were the seven foreign players drafted to Kerala Blasters. Along with them, the club directly signed Penn Orji, Jamie McAllister, Andrew Barisic, Stephen Pearson and Colin Falvey in the remaining foreign players slots.

Inaugural season

Kerala Blasters played their first game on 13 October 2014 against NorthEast United at the Indira Gandhi Athletic Stadium; they lost the game 1–0 after Koke scored in the 45th minute. On 21 October, the club's first-ever goal was scored by Iain Hume during their second match, which was against Chennaiyin. Despite Hume's goal, the Blasters lost the game 2–1. The Blasters first win came in their fourth game, which was played against Pune City; Chinadorai Sabeeth and Penn Orji scored the club's goals, leading to a 2–1 victory. After playing their first five matches away from home, Kerala Blasters hosted their first home match on 6 November 2014 against Goa. A goal by Milagres Gonsalves led to a 1–0 victory in front of 49,517 fans at the Jawaharlal Nehru Stadium (Kochi). The Blasters qualified for the playoffs on 9 December 2014 with a 1–0 victory over Pune City.

After finishing in fourth place during the regular season, the side played their first semi-finals match on 13 December 2014 against Chennaiyin. Despite not being considered the favourite to win the two-legged tie, they won the first leg at home 3–0 with goals from Ishfaq Ahmed, Iain Hume, and Sushanth Mathew. During the second leg in Chennai, the Blasters were about to suffer a massive setback. Despite entering the second leg with a three-goal advantage, Chennaiyin drew the tie level by winning in regular time 3–0. In extra time, however, Stephen Pearson scored the decisive goal in the 117th minute to win the tie 4–3 to enter the final.

In the final, Kerala Blasters played ATK at the DY Patil Stadium in Mumbai.  Hume should have given Blasters the lead after 55 minutes, but he took too long alone in front of the goalkeeper, allowing the defenders to eventually block his shot. The match was destined to go to extra time until ATK were given a corner kick in the last minute, and headed the ball at the near post. As a result, the Blasters lost the match 1–0 despite dominating it throughout the 90 minutes.

2015 season

After the 2014 season, the club announced David James would not return to the club as the head coach and marquee player, and on 12 May 2015, it was confirmed that former England Under-20 head coach Peter Taylor would take over the manager role at the club. The club signed a new roster of foreign players, which includes Carlos Marchena as the marquee signing.

The first match of the season was played at the Jawaharlal Nehru Stadium against NorthEast United where the Blasters won 3–1 with goals from Josu, Mohammed Rafi, and Sanchez Watt. They drew their next match against Mumbai City and then lost their next four matches, which led to the dismissal of Peter Taylor as head coach. Assistant coach Trevor Morgan was in charge for one match before Terry Phelan was named as the head coach for the rest of the season. The Blasters ended their second season in the last place of the league table.

2016 season

In an effort to rebuild the team after failing to qualify for the semi-finals in the previous season, the Blasters announced the signing of Steve Coppell as their head coach on 21 June 2016. A week later, the club announced the signing of Northern Ireland international Aaron Hughes as their marquee player for the season.

The season began with a 1–0 defeat away from home against NorthEast United. The Blasters struggled early in the season, as they failed to score goals. After the return of C.K. Vineeth from his loan-spell with Bengaluru FC, Blasters solved their goal-scoring issue. He scored four goals from his first five matches which includes a winner against FC Goa and a brace over Chennaiyin FC. In order to qualify for semi-final, Blasters needed to avoid a defeat against North East United FC. Vineeth's only goal in the 66th minute helped Blasters to beat North East United 1-0 to seal the second place behind Mumbai City FC in the league table.

After finishing in second place during the regular season, the Blasters played third-placed Delhi Dynamos in the first leg of the semi-finals, which took place in Kochi. The Blasters won the match 1–0 through Kervens Belfort's 65th-minute goal. During the second leg in Delhi, the Dynamos won in extra time 2–1, which meant the scores became tie on aggregate and the match went to penalty shootout where the Blasters won it 3–0 to enter the final. In the final, the Blasters played host to ATK and got the lead early through Mohammed Rafi before ATK equalized soon after and the match went into a penalty shootout. Despite taking the lead early in the shootout, the Blasters lost 4–3; it was their second finals defeat in three seasons.

2017–18 season

After losing in the previous season's finals, Steve Coppell rejected a new contract extension so the club appointed former Manchester United assistant manager René Meulensteen as their new manager. Blasters released all of their foreign players and signed some more, including former Manchester United players Dimitar Berbatov and Wes Brown. Sandesh Jhingan was appointed as the captain and the club re-signed their leading goalscorer from the first season Iain Hume. The Blasters won only one of their first eight games that season, leading to the sacking of Meulensteen. Fan-favourite manager David James returned to the squad as caretaker. The Blasters won five of the remaining ten matches and finished sixth in the 2017-18 Indian Super League season. They were eliminated in the first round of the Super Cup.

2018–19 season

Having failed to qualify for the previous season's semi-finals, the Blasters signed a three-year deal with manager David James. With a new roster, Kerala Blasters had one of their worst seasons ever, won only one and drawn six of their twelve fixtures, leading to the sacking of James. This was the season that witnessed the club's rising star Sahal Abdul Samad's emergence as Blasters' mainstay in midfield. After the international mid-season break, the Blasters appointed Nelo Vingada as their new manager for the remaining six matches. Of the remaining games, the team had only one win and three draws and finished ninth in the league. They were eliminated from the Super Cup in the qualifying round of the tournament.

2019–20 season

After a disappointing season, the Blasters appointed Eelco Schattorie as their new manager. The club released all of their foreign players and signed a new roster that included Cameroon-born Raphaël Messi Bouli and former Nigeria international Bartholomew Ogbeche as forwards. Blasters beat their arch-rivals ATK on the season's first day. Throughout the season, the team was hit by injury concerns. Defender Sandesh Jhingan, who captained the club for the last two seasons, was out of action with an ACL injury and newly signed Brazilian defender Jairo Rodrigues was also injured. Both defenders missed the entire season and Rodrigues played a few matches in the start. Gianni Zuiverloon and Mario Arqués and other players were also hit by minor injuries in the season; they missed some of the crucial fixtures. The Blasters finished the season in seventh place in the table.

2020–21 season

From the 2020-21 season onwards, the management decided to build a new strategy at the club. As a part of this, the Blasters appointed Karolis Skinkys as their new sporting director on 15 March 2020. On 22 April 2020, the club officially announced the appointment of Kibu Vicuña as their new manager. Fan-favourite defender Sandesh Jhingan left the club on 21 May 2020 by mutual consent, ending his six-year association with the Blasters.

The Blasters decided to rely more upon young Indian players and extended the contracts of Sahal and Rahul KP until 2025. They signed Nishu Kumar on a four-year deal from Bengaluru FC. The Blasters only extended the contract of Sergio Cido among the foreign players and signed a new roster of them under the supervision of the new sporting director.

Due to COVID-19 pandemic, the seventh season of ISL was decided to take place in 3 venues in Goa behind closed doors. Same as in the previous season, the team suffered an early setback, with this time, captain Sergio Cidoncha suffering a ligament injury on his right ankle during their third match against Chennaiyin FC, ruling out for the remainder of the season. It took the Blasters seven games to register their first victory of the season, winning against Hyderabad FC 2–0. The team were  affected by injuries, lesser compared to the previous season. They lost 18 points from winning position, which includes 4 losses after taking the early lead. The club had the worst defensive performance in their history conceding 33 goals in 18 games and had only 3 wins. On 17 February 2021, after a 4–0 loss against Hyderabad FC on 16 February, Kibu Vicuna and the management decided to part ways on mutual consent. Assistant manager Ishfaq Ahmed was appointed as the interim head coach for the remaining 2 games of the season. The club's fortunes remained largely unchanged in the season as they finished tenth place in the league table.

2021–22 season

After another disappointing season, the club appointed Ivan Vukomanović as their head coach on 17 June 2021. The Blasters started their pre-season camp in July 2021, and played the most number of friendlies across all ISL clubs prior to the season. In August, the club confirmed their participation in the 2021 Durand Cup, thus competing in the tournament for the first time in its history. After three league stage matches, they were knocked out of the tournament, following their defeat over Delhi FC on 22 September. On 19 November, the Blasters played their first match of the 2021–22 Indian Super League season against ATK Mohun Bagan, which they lost 4–2. The club won their first match of the season by defeating Odisha on 5 December by 2–1. This victory was Kerala Blasters' first ISL victory in 11 months. After their defeat in the opening match of the season, the Blasters remained unbeaten for the next 10 games, until they were beaten by the southern rivals Bengaluru on 30 January. In between the unbeaten run, the Blasters moved to the top spot in league table for the first time in 7 years during the middle of the season. After Mumbai City's defeat against Hyderabad on 6 March, the Blasters qualified for the playoffs for the first time since the 2016 season. When the regular phase of the season ended, Vukomanović's Blasters side broke many club records in terms of the number of wins, total number of goals and clean-sheets, points-per-game, and achieved a positive goal difference for the first time in the club's history.

With the Blasters winning 2–1 on aggregate against Jamshedpur from both the semi-finals, they qualified for the finals of the ISL for the third time in their history. They faced Hyderabad in the final on 20 March, which they lost in the penalty shoot-out. It was the club's third defeat in an Indian Super League final.

2022–23 season

On 4 April 2022, the club announced a three-year contract extension of head coach Ivan Vukomanović till 2025. It was the first time that the club has renewed the contract of a first-team head coach in its history.

Crest, colours and kits
The crest and colours for Kerala Blasters were announced at the club's official launch on 15 September 2014.

Crest
The club's crest is designed around the elephant, one of Kerala's main symbols, to reflect its place in Kerala's culture and festivities, and to represent the state's sporting legacy. The elephant holds a football with its trunk, denoting the state's deep connection with the sport. The elephant is a symbol of unity, power, and pride; it also symbolises the heritage, culture, spirit, and passion of Kerala, and its love for football.

Colours

Since its inception, the club colours have been yellow and blue. Yellow is the club's primary colour as well as its main identity. According to former co-owner Sachin Tendulkar, yellow stands for determination and faith. During their inaugural season, the club wore yellow shirts and blue shorts and this was used until the 2016 season. For the 2017–18 season, the Blasters introduced an all-yellow kit with a different shade of yellow. Here the blue remained as the secondary colour that flows across the side of the shirt. This kit was used for the 2018–19 season, after which the team returned to its traditional yellow and blue kit with the same shades as the previous season. In 2020, a new jersey in the club's customary yellow and blue colours was launched, with this time, the blue coming in the arms. The kit which pays homage to the state of Kerala also had horizontal lines that run along the breadth of the jersey.

The club's away colours for the first three seasons were yellow shirts and white shorts. For the 2017–18 season, the club introduced the all-black jersey with yellow stripe on the bottom of arms and shorts and this was used until the 2019–20 season. In 2020, the Blasters launched a new blue away kit with a distinctive pattern. This kit was launched by the club as a dedication to their fans, who were missed at the stands due to COVID-19 pandemic.

In 2020, the Blasters launched a contest for the fans to design the club's first-ever third kit for the 2020–21 season. The third kit which had a white and gold colour scheme, designed by one of the fan was released by the club as an honour to the sacrifices and contribution of the frontline workers, who have been relentlessly working to win the fight against the COVID-19 pandemic.

Kit manufacturers and shirt sponsors

Stadium

Kerala Blasters play their home matches at the Jawaharlal Nehru Stadium in the city of Kochi. The stadium is multipurpose but is mostly used for football. It has hosted games of both the Indian national football and cricket teams, and has hosted National Football League and I-League clubs FC Kochin and Chirag United Club Kerala. The stadium was also a venue for the Indian Premier League side Kochi Tuskers Kerala and was selected as a venue for the 2017 FIFA U-17 World Cup. As a part of the FIFA event, the stadium was renovated and new seats were fitted and its capacity was reduced to 50,000 and later to 41,000, taking into account security issues. The stadium received the Best Pitch of the Season Award of the League in the 2018-19 season of Indian Super League. In 2019, Greater Cochin Development Authority proposed the installation of solar panels in the stadium, which would make it the first such venue in Kerala and the third in the country to be powered by solar energy.

Support

Kerala Blasters are known in the ISL for their fanatical supporters. Averaging over 55,000 fans a game, the Blasters had the highest average attendance in most of the seasons they have played and it fell to 37,500 in 2017 because safety regulations reduced the stadium's capacity to 41,000 as a part of 2017 FIFA U-17 World Cup where Kochi was a venue. According to former India international player Pappachen Pradeep, "In Kerala, the people support football tirelessly. It doesn't matter if the team wins or loses, they are always there in high numbers. I've played at places like Kolkata, where if the team loses two-three matches on the spin, the numbers in the stadium diminish. There is nothing like that in Kerala." However Kerala Blasters have seen reduction in the average attendance below 30,000 on two seasons. During 2018–19 season, the Blasters had an average attendance of 16,432 and it became 17,500 in 2019–20 season.

According to Fox Asia, the Blasters are the sixth most-popular Asian club on social media, becoming so in 2018 within the four years of its existence and were the youngest club among the list. They are also the most followed Indian club on social media. In February 2021, Kerala Blasters became the first Indian club to attain two million followers on Instagram. According to a research in 2021, the club has the joint-fastest growing social media account on Instagram in Asia and sixth across the world in terms of fans interaction among all the football clubs.

The Blasters are also known for having one of the most vocal and passionate supporters group known as Manjappada. Founded in 2014, they are one of the largest and most active supporters group in the country. The group has also won the award for the 'Best Fan Club' at the Indian Sports Honours for two times in 2017 and 2020.

Rivalries

South Indian Derby

The club's main rivals are their South Indian neighbours, Chennaiyin FC and Bengaluru FC.

Chennaiyin FC
Kerala Blasters have developed a rivalry with fellow southern club Chennaiyin FC from the inaugural season of the Indian Super League itself. Former Chennaiyin head coach and player Marco Materazzi was sent off when the clubs played each other in the 2014 semi-final and was then given a one-match suspension in 2016 after he was involved in a scuffle between a Chennaiyin player and a Kerala Blasters player. This incident led Kerala Blasters fans to wear masks of Zinedine Zidane at the return leg in Kochi, intensifying the rivalry between the clubs. The meetings between the two clubs later came to be known as the South Indian Derby. Bengaluru FC became a part of the South Indian Derby, when they joined Indian Super League in 2017.

Bengaluru FC
The Blasters have also developed a rivalry with Karnataka-based club Bengaluru FC, which started in 2017 before Bengaluru began playing in the ISL. The rivalry stems from the competition between both clubs fan bases; Manjappada of the Blasters and Bengaluru's West Block Blues. The South Indian Derby between the Blasters and Bengaluru is often known as the Real South Indian Derby.

Rivalry with ATK Mohun Bagan

The Blasters shares an intense rivalry with the Kolkata based club ATK Mohun Bagan. Even before the inception of Indian Super League, the states of Kerala and West Bengal had a long lasting rivalry in the Santosh Trophy. The club's rivalry with ATK started at the 2014 final, which ATK won in extra time. Both clubs once again met at the final in 2016, which the Blasters lost on penalties. In 2020, ATK merged with the football section of multi-sport club Mohun Bagan to form ATK Mohun Bagan.

Ownership and finances

In April 2014, it was announced that the former India cricket captain Sachin Tendulkar, along with PVP Ventures, won the bidding for the Kochi franchise in Indian Super League. A consortium named Blasters Sports Ventures Private Limited (BSVPL) was established to oversee the administration and operations of the club. Tendulkar said that he took a stake in the club because he wanted to help popularise football in India and to see Kerala return to its former glory as a footballing state. In May 2014, he said; "People used to call me Master Blaster. I'm supporting Kerala, Kochi team. I hope the entire Kerala will be behind our football team. That's why we thought of naming it as Kerala Blasters FC." PVP group owned 60 percent of the club. In October 2015, Securities and Exchange Board of India, imposed a fine of ₹30 crore on PVP Group for not complying with diclosure terms, pushing the club into financial uncertainty. To overcome the financial crisis, Tendulkar partnered with the club's main sponsor Muthoot Group, bought 40 percent from PVP Group's stake and acquired the majority stake at the club.

In June 2016, it was confirmed that a consortium led by industrialist Nimmagadda Prasad, Telugu film actors Chiranjeevi, Nagarjuna and film producer Allu Aravind have purchased 80 percent stake at the club. The 20 percent stake of the club remained with Tendulkar. In September 2018, Tendulkar sold his remaining stake at the club to its majority shareholders for personal reasons, stating; "A piece of my heart will always beat for Kerala Blasters". In January 2021, the consortium was renamed as Magnum Sports Private Limited. The consortium also includes Anil Yerramreddy, the global CEO of MOURI Tech. Nikhil Bhardwaj, son of the majority shareholder Nimmagadda Prasad is the director of the club.

Magnum Sports Private Limited also owns the Pro Kabaddi League team Tamil Thalaivas and in 2020, entered in a partnership with Serbian volleyball club Radnicki Belgrade to form Radnicki Blasters, which plays in the Serbian First Division tournaments.

Sponsorship
On 29 September 2014, it was announced Kerala-based Muthoot Pappachan Group would be the title sponsor for Kerala Blasters. Under the original agreement, the company would sponsor the Blasters for one season with the option to extend the sponsorship. On 24 October that year, a month later, the Blasters  announced the German sports manufacturer Puma would be the kit sponsors for the 2014 season. Both sponsorships continued in 2015 and Muthoot remained as title sponsor into the 2016 season. In June 2019, the Blasters signed a five-year deal with Jain University to be the presenting sponsor of the club. In September 2020, the club signed a long-term deal with Statsports as their performance partner. On 7 November 2020, the Blasters  announced its association with BYJU'S, the world's largest EdTech company, as their new title sponsor on a five-year deal. In December 2021, the Blasters announced its association with MOURI Tech, an enterprise solutions provider as official partners ahead of the 2021–22 season.

Players

First-team squad

Out on loan

Personnel

Current technical staff

Management
{| class="wikitable"
|-
! scope="col"|Position 
! scope="col"|Name
! scope="col"|
|-
|Director of Operations
|  Nikhil Bhardwaj
|
|-
| Sporting director
| Karolis Skinkys
|
|-
| Technical Advisor of Reserves & Head of Grassroots Development
|  Tomasz Tchórz
|
|-
| Director of Academy and Women's Team
|  Rajah Rizwan
|
|-
| Team Manager
|  Manish Kochar
|
|-
| Chief Financial Officer
|  Mohit Thadi
|
|-
| Chief Marketing Officer
|  Antony Manu
|
|-
| Chief Revenue Officer 
|  Joby Joseph
|
|-

Records and statistics

Season by season

Correct as the end of the 2021–22 season.

Managerial history

Player records

Reserves and academy

Kerala Blasters Reserves
On 20 February 2018, the All India Football Federation, the organising body for Indian football announced the Kerala Blasters and six other ISL sides would field a reserve team in the I-League 2nd Division, India's second division football league. The team began playing in March 2018, when it was coached by Renjith TA. The team's best performance came out in 2020 as they won the 2019–20 Kerala Premier League after defeating the reserve side of Gokulam Kerala FC in a Penalty shootout.

Kerala Blasters Youth and Academy
The Kerala Blasters youth system, which is known as KBFC Young Blasters, consists of three teams from the under-18, under-15 and under-13 age groups.

In media
Kerala Blasters were featured in the Manorama's programme 'Blasting out with Blasters', which shared in-depth interviews with the players and behind-the-scenes footages from the club's camp during the 2017–18 season. On 19 November 2020, a day ahead of the 2020–21 ISL season, the Blasters released Yennum Yellow, a musical album inspired by the passionate fanbase of the club across the globe. The album consists of six songs that shows the importance of yellow to its fans and it was the first time in India that a football club released an album as a dedication to their fans. A week later, the Blasters also launched the Yennum Yellow comic book envisioned to provide the fans with a fun way to learn more about the club, its history, the squad and the activities being carried out by the club. This was also a first of its kind project in Indian Football.

eSports
The organizers of ISL introduced eISL, a FIFA video game tournament, for the ISL playing clubs, each represented by two players. Kerala Blasters hosted a series of qualifying games for all the participants wanting to represent the club in eISL. On 20 November 2021, the club announced the signing of the two players.

Roster

Honours
 Indian Super League
 Runners-up (3): 2014, 2016, 2021–22
Kerala Premier League
 Winners (1): 2019–20

See also 
 Football in Kerala
 Football in India

References

External links

 
 
 Kerala Blasters at the Indian Super League official website.

 
Kerala Blasters FC
Kerala Blasters FC
Kerala Blasters FC
Kerala Blasters FC
Kerala Blasters FC